Richard Mbulu (born 25 January 1994) is a Malawian professional footballer who plays as a forward for Iraqi side Al-Najaf SC. He was included in Malawi's squad for the 2021 Africa Cup of Nations.

Early life
Mbulu was born in Mangochi, Malawi.

Club career
Having started his career at Malawi Armed Forces College following his enlistment in the armed forces, he joined Mozambican side Costa do Sol in December 2016. He later moved to Portuguese side A.D. Sanjoanense before returning to Costa do Sol in the summer of 2018. In the summer of 2019, Mbulu signed for South African side Baroka on a three-year deal.

International career
He was called up to the Malawi national football team for the first time in January 2017, and made his debut for them on 10 June 2017 in a 1–0 win against Comoros. He scored his first goal for Malawi on 4 September 2017 in a 1–0 win against Togo. He scored the only goal of a 1–0 win against Uganda which allowed Malawi to qualify for the 2021 Africa Cup of Nations.

Personal life
When Mbulu left school, he became a soldier but later decided to pursue a career in football. His father was also a footballer and a soldier.

References

External links
 

Living people
1994 births
Malawian footballers
Malawi international footballers
Association football forwards

CD Costa do Sol players
A.D. Sanjoanense players
Baroka F.C. players
Najaf FC players
Campeonato de Portugal (league) players
South African Premier Division players
Malawian expatriate footballers
Expatriate footballers in Mozambique
Expatriate footballers in Portugal
Expatriate soccer players in South Africa
Expatriate footballers in Iraq
Malawian expatriate sportspeople in Mozambique
Malawian expatriate sportspeople in Portugal
Malawian expatriate sportspeople in South Africa

2021 Africa Cup of Nations players